Jan Persson (July 22, 1943 – November 15, 2018) worked as freelance photographer since 1962 for Danish newspapers and magazines in and around Copenhagen. Early on he specialized on documenting the jazz scene, later also the visiting beat and rock musicians who visited Copenhagen during the sixties and the seventies. His works have been documented in a series of books and exhibitions (see bibliography and exhibitions) and his pictures are used on more than 1000 album and CD covers.

Biography 
Persson supplied photos to Down Beat since 1962, Jazz Special (DK), Musica Jazz (IT), Melody Maker (UK) and Danish newspapers Politiken, Berlingske Tidende and Ekstra Bladet. Persson received the Ben Webster Prize in March 2004. His photographs were published by a number of magazines, reissue record companies, and documentary films on the history of both jazz and rock music. Persson's jazz and rock photographs feature American jazz greats Louis Armstrong and Miles Davis to rock icons Bob Dylan and Jimi Hendrix. His photo archives have been exhibited internationally. More than 15.000 pictures are now in the files of Aalborg University in Denmark. Persson died in 2018 at age 75 due to cancer in a hospice near Copenhagen. He leaves behind his wife, MajBritt Persson and three children from earlier marriage, Christina Persson, Louise Persson, and Julie Lund

Bibliography
Jan Persson's books (primarily in Danish):
 
 
 
 Finn Slumstrup Gyldendals bog om Jazz ("Gyldendal's Book on Jazz") (Gyldendal Publ. Coorp., 2003)
 Erik Moseholm Den Hemmelige Krystal ("The Secret Crystal")(elkjaeroghansen, 2003)
 Peter H. Larsen & Thorbjørn Sjøgren NHØP (Niels-Henning Ørsted Pedersen)(Gyldendal Publ. Company, 2005)
 Torben Bille & Jan Persson: Gas (Gasolin) (Gyldendal Publ. Company, 2006)
 Finn Slumstrup Jazz – En musikalske guide (Gyldendal, 2007)
 Torben Bille & Jan Persson Midt i en Beattid (“The World’s Greatest Rock Stars in Denmark 1964-74”) (Gyldendal Publ. Company, 2008)
 Christian Munch-Hansen By af Jazz (“City of Jazz”) (Thanning og Appel 2008)
 Frank Büchmann-Møller & Henrik Wolsgaard-Iversen Montmartre, Jazzhuset i St. Regnegade 19, København K (Jazzsign & Syddansk Universitetsforlag 2008)
 Tore Mortensen Fortællinger om Jazzen. (“Tellings of Jazz”) (Aalborg Universitetsforlag 2010)
 
 

FURTHER REPRESENTED IN THE FOLLOWING PUBLICATIONS
 Lee Tanner The Jazz Image, Masters of Jazz Photography (Harry N. Abrams, New York 2006)
 Richard Williams Dylan, A Man Called Alias (Bloomsbury, London 1992)
 Richard Williams Miles Davis, The Man In The Green Shirt (Bloomsbury, London 1993)
 Richard Williams Jazz, A Photographic Documentary (Studio Editions Ltd., London 1994)
 Lee Tanner & Lee Hildebrand Images of the Blues (Freedman/Fairfax, New York 1998)
 Scatti Jazz: La Tradizion del nuova (Lucianno Vanni Editore, Milano 2003)

Exhibitions
 Musikhuset  Århus, Denmark,1990
 Govinda Gallery, Washington, USA ”Monks World”, 1997 
 The Jazz Gallery, New York, USA ”Images of Miles Davis”, 1998
 North Sea Jazz Festival, Den Haag, Holland with Gorm Valentine & Jørgen Bo, 1999
 Travelling Exhibition in Spain with Gorm Valentin & Jørgen Bo, 2001
 Missouri History Museum, St.Louis USA. 24 fotos af Miles Davis, 2001
 Travelling Exhibition in Italy with Gorm Valentin & Nicola Fasano, 2003
 Studio Gallery, Los Angeles, USA, 2005
 The Jazz Bakery, Los Angeles, USA, 2005
 Copenhagen Central Library, Denmark, 2006
 Gladsaxe Main Library, Denmark, 2007
 Casa Bossi, Novara Jazzfestival, Italy, 2011

Awards
 Ben Webster Prize, Denmark, 2004
 Jazzformidlerprisen (The Jazz Communicator Award), Denmark, 2009
 jazzahead! Skoda Award, Bremen, Germany, 2014.

References

20th-century Danish photographers
Danish photographers
Jazz photographers
1943 births
2018 deaths